Rachel Lynn Lindsay-Abasolo (born April 21, 1985) is an American media personality and attorney. She is best known for her role as a contestant on the twenty-first season of ABC's The Bachelor and as the lead of its spinoff, The Bachelorette, in its thirteenth season. She was the first African-American lead in the Bachelor franchise. Lindsay is married to the winner of her Bachelorette season, chiropractor Bryan Abasolo. She is a correspondent for Extra as well as a co-host of the Higher Learning podcast alongside Van Lathan on The Ringer platform. Lindsay was also a partial owner of the FCF Shoulda Been Stars Indoor Football Team.

Early life and education
Born and raised in Dallas, Lindsay is the daughter of beauty consultant and former computer programmer Kathy and federal judge Sam A. Lindsay. She has an older sister, Constance, and a younger sister, Heather.

Lindsay obtained her Bachelor's degree from The University of Texas at Austin where she studied kinesiology and sports management and is a member of Delta Sigma Theta sorority. She received her J.D. degree from Marquette University in Milwaukee, Wisconsin. Lindsay became licensed to practice in the state of Texas on November 4, 2011.

Career
Lindsay worked as a legislative intern for Texas State Senator Royce West and had interned with the Milwaukee Bucks. She then worked at the law firm Cooper & Scully, P.C.

In July 2018, Lindsay was a guest host on ESPN's First Take.  Later that year, she started hosting Football Frenzy, a new ESPN radio show, alongside former Dallas Cowboys Linebacker Bobby Carpenter.

In May 2020, Lindsay launched a podcast Higher Learning with co-host Van Lathan. She has also been a co-host of the Bachelor Happy Hour podcast since it debuted in July 2019.

Lindsay was one of five partial owners of the FCF Wild Aces, an indoor football team that was part of Fan Controlled Football. After the team disbanded, she continued her role as partial owner of the team's new iteration, the FCF Shoulda Been Stars.

On January 25, 2022, she released her book, Miss Me With That: Hot Takes, Helpful Tidbits, and a Few Hard Truths.

Television shows

The Bachelor

Lindsay was a contestant on Nick Viall's season of The Bachelor. She received the first impression rose on night one. She placed third overall, losing to runner-up Raven Gates and winner Vanessa Grimaldi.

The Bachelorette

Lindsay was announced as the Bachelorette on February 13, 2017, while she was still in contention for Nick Viall's final rose. For Lindsay's season ABC had cast the most diverse cast in Bachelor franchise history. In the end, Lindsay  chose Miami native Bryan Abasolo, a doctor of chiropractic, over Peter. The engaged couple lived in Dallas  before moving to Miami in early 2019. They married in August 2019.

Lindsay returned with Abasolo during Becca Kufrin's season of The Bachelorette to host the first group date. She also made an appearance during season 16 of The Bachelorette which first featured Clare Crawley as the lead followed by Tayshia Adams.

The Bachelor Winter Games 
Lindsay appeared in one episode of The Bachelor Winter Games where she judged a kissing contest along with JoJo Fletcher and Arie Luyendyk.

Ghosted: Love Gone Missing 
On September 10, 2019, Ghosted: Love Gone Missing premiered on MTV, the series is hosted by Lindsay alongside artist and actor Travis Mills. In this series, Mills and Lindsay assist people in confronting former friends or partners after being ghosted.

Judge Rachel's Court 
In May 2020, it was announced that Lindsay was in talks with 20th Television to host and co-executive produce a syndicated court show, Judge Rachel's Court, expected to debut in September 2021.

Extra
Lindsay started working for Extra as a special correspondent in 2019. In August 2020, it was announced that she would be a full-time correspondent for season 27. She started her tenure on September 8.

Personal life

Lindsay is married to Bryan Abasolo, who won Season 13 of The Bachelorette. She and Abasolo married on August 24, 2019, in Cancun, Mexico.

References

External links 
 

Living people
People from Dallas
1985 births
African-American women lawyers
African-American lawyers
21st-century American women lawyers
21st-century American lawyers
Bachelor Nation contestants
Victims of cyberbullying
21st-century African-American women
21st-century African-American people
20th-century African-American people
20th-century African-American women